The Tapulao shrew-rat (Rhynchomys tapulao) is a rodent in the subfamily Murinae. It was described in 2007.

References

Rhynchomys
Mammals described in 2007
Rhynchomys tapulaoTapulao shrew-rat